Austin O'Connor (born 10 December 1974) is an Irish equestrian.

He participated at the 2000 Summer Olympics in Sydney. He competed at the 2008 Summer Olympics in Beijing, where he placed 8th in team eventing with the Irish team. He also competed in individual eventing. He competed in the 2020 Summer Olympics.

References

External links
 
 

 

1974 births
Living people
Sportspeople from Cork (city)
Irish male equestrians
Olympic equestrians of Ireland
Equestrians at the 2000 Summer Olympics
Equestrians at the 2008 Summer Olympics
Equestrians at the 2020 Summer Olympics